Kazuki Oiwa (大岩 一貴, born 17 August 1989) is a Japanese football player for Shonan Bellmare.

Career statistics

Club
Updated to 7 August 2022.

1Includes Emperor's Cup.
2Includes J. League Cup.

References

External links
Profile at Vegalta Sendai
Profile at JEF United Chiba

1989 births
Living people
Chuo University alumni
Association football people from Aichi Prefecture
Japanese footballers
J1 League players
J2 League players
JEF United Chiba players
Vegalta Sendai players
Shonan Bellmare players
Association football defenders
Universiade gold medalists for Japan
Universiade medalists in football
Medalists at the 2011 Summer Universiade